La Pintada is a district (distrito) of Coclé Province in Panama. The population according to the 2000 census was 23,202. The district covers a total area of 1,030 km². The capital lies at the town of La Pintada.

Administrative divisions
La Pintada District is divided administratively into the following corregimientos:

La Pintada (capital)
El Harino
El Potrero
Llano Grande
Piedras Gordas
Las Lomas
Llano Norte

References

Districts of Coclé Province